Team Envy was an American esports franchise based in Dallas, Texas, owned by Envy Gaming. Founded in 2007 as a professional Call of Duty team under the moniker Team EnVyUs, they fielded rosters in Counter-Strike, FIFA, Fortnite, Gears of War, Halo, League of Legends, Chess, Magic: the Gathering, Overwatch, Paladins, PUBG, Rocket League, SMITE, StarCraft, Super Smash Bros., Street Fighter and Valorant. Following the merger between Envy Gaming and OpTic Gaming, Envy Gaming retired the Team Envy brand in June 2022, shifting all of them to the OpTic Gaming moniker.

History

Call of Duty

Team EnVyUs was founded on November 19, 2007, as a Call of Duty 4 esports team by Skyler "FoRePlayy" Johnson and Tosh "Stainville" McGruder. The team finished runners-up in both the 2008 and 2009 MLG National Championships, with the 2009 roster fielding future owner Mike "Hastr0" Rufail.

At the 2011 National Championship, the final event of the Call of Duty: Black Ops season, Envy once again finished runners-up following a 5-match loser's bracket run; the event also marked the beginning of the classic rivalry with OpTic Gaming, dubbed the eClasico, after defeating them in the loser's bracket final.

In April 2013, as part of the Call of Duty: Black Ops II season, Envy competed in the inaugural US$1 million Call of Duty Championship; their roster for the tournament notably included Stainville, Raymond "Rambo" Lussier and Jordan "JKap" Kaplan. Non-favorites entering the event, the team showed they belonged after beating the undefeated Fariko Impact 3–2 in the winner's bracket finals to book a place in the grand finals. The grand finals consisted of a best-of-11 continuation series re-match with Fariko, where Envy would fall just short after losing 5–6 following a game 11 Search and Destroy, winner-takes-all, showdown. The final round earned the title of "the most famous round of Search and Destroy in Call of Duty history", as well as the match being widely considered one of the "greatest series ever played" in Call of Duty history. The following month, on May 5, Team Envy won their first ever prized LAN championship and only Black Ops II title at UGC Niagara.

In March 2014, as part of the Call of Duty: Ghosts season, Envy competed in the 2014 Call of Duty Championship. The team would once again finish 2nd after producing a miracle run starting from round 1 of the loser's bracket, including a 3–1 victory over OpTic in the loser's bracket final. On June 25, 2014, they announced the return of JKap and the acquisition of Matthew "Formal" Piper. The new roster won Gfinity 3, Envy's first major LAN championship, and Season 3 of MLG's Ghosts Pro League. However, the roster was short-lived as after ESWC 2014, the last event of Ghosts, star AR player Formal and Envy mutually agreed to part ways.

Moving into Call of Duty: Advanced Warfare, Envy made multiple roster changes throughout a disappointing season. The team managed a top-12 finish at the 2015 Call of Duty Championship, before reaching their only final at UGC Niagara 2015. They ended the season with a 4th-place finish at the 2015 MLG World Finals.

In April 2016, Envy acquired Bryan "Apathy" Zhelyazkov and Johnathon "John" Perez to join JKap and Austin "SlasheR" Liddicoat for the latter half of the Call of Duty: Black Ops III season. Together they won Stage 2 of the NA Call of Duty World League, Envy's first major championship since Ghosts. The team then participated at the 2016 MLG Orlando Open, where following a loser's bracket run they met OpTic in the grand finals. In the finals they took the first best-of-5 series 3–2, before being swept in the deciding series. In the last event of the season, in September 2016, Envy competed in the 2016 Call of Duty World League Championship. The team went undefeated in the group stages and drew a winner's bracket round 1 match-up with heavy favorites OpTic, who they had not defeated on LAN in over two years. A 3–1 victory over OpTic, followed by a 3–0 over FaZe Clan opened the path to the grand finals where they met Splyce in the first ever North American vs. European final. Team Envy took down Splyce 3–1 to finally break their 2nd place curse and win the Call of Duty Championship; securing $800,000 as part of the largest Call of Duty prize pool.

Maintaining their championship winning roster, they headed into the Call of Duty: Infinite Warfare season. The first three-quarters of the season proved disappointing as the team failed to live up to their Black Ops III success, with their only notable result being a 3rd-place finish at the 2017 MLG Atlanta Open in February 2017. It was not until the last two events that Envy bounced back. In July 2017, the team finished runners-up at Stage 2 of the 2017 CWL Global Pro League. In August 2017, they competed in the 2017 Call of Duty World League Championship where they attempted to become the first back-to-back champions. In the winner's bracket semi-finals they defeated  3–1, which included their famous second half 0–10 to 12–10 Uplink comeback. In the winner's bracket final they defeated OpTic to book their place in a record 4th Call of Duty Championship grand finals, however this time around the roster would be heartbroken as they lost both best-of-5 series to OpTic in a rematch to finish in 2nd place.

Heading into Call of Duty: WWII, Envy released JKap, Apathy, and John. In November 2017, they revealed their new roster which included Cuyler "Huke" Garland who had been competing in Team Envy's Halo division as he was too young (under the age of 18) to compete in the Call of Duty World League.

On September 22, 2018, Envy acquired the roster of Evil Geniuses consisting of ACHES, Apathy, Assault and SiLLy. They will join the organization and pair with Huke to complete the roster.

Team Envy's parent company Envy Gaming purchased a Call of Duty League slot in late 2019, ending Team Envy's Call of Duty division. The team, Dallas Empire, competes in the league in the 2020 season.

Counter-Strike
Team Envy officially entered the Counter-Strike scene, their first venture into PC Esports, on February 2, 2015, after acquiring the French Counter-Strike: Global Offensive (CS:GO) squad of Team LDLC led by captain Vincent "Happy" Schopenhauer.

In March 2015, Envy finished 3rd–4th in their first major appearance, ESL One Katowice 2015, after losing to Ninjas in Pyjamas 0–2 in the semi-finals. Shortly afterwards, in March, the team won their first ever championship at the Gfinity Spring Masters. On June 21, 2015, they traded Richard "shox" Papillon and Edouard "SmithZz" Dubourdeaux to Titan in exchange for Kenny "kennyS" Schrub and Dan "apEX" Madesclaire. With the new roster they finished runners-up at the ESL One Cologne 2015 major, before finally winning their first major championship at DreamHack Open Cluj-Napoca 2015 after defeating Natus Vincere 2–0 in the grand finals. Following the November 2015 Paris terrorist attacks, Envy withdrew from IEM San Jose due to travel safety concerns. The team ended the 2015 season securing 7 championships and 11 grand final appearances.

In March 2016, following an 11–12th-place finish at IEM Katowice 2016, Envy benched Fabien "kioShiMa" Fiey due to communication problems and LDLC White's Timothée "DEVIL" Démolon replaced him in the starting line-up. However, the change would prove unsuccessful and in October 2016, DEVIL was released with Christophe "SIXER" Xia replacing him. On January 15, 2017, the team won WESG 2016, securing US$800,000 as part of the largest CS:GO prize pool.

In February 2017, kennyS, apEX, and Nathan "NBK" Schmitt departed to G2 Esports, with Adil "ScreaM" Benrlitom, Cédric "RpK" Guipouy, and Alexandre "xms" Forté joining in their stead. In late April, Envy officially revealed their academy project.

On June 20, 2018, Team Envy announced they had departed from the Counter-Strike esports scene following the release of their entire CS:GO roster. On September 27, 2018, they announced a new North American team, signing the core of ex-Splyce. Team Envy disbanded their CS:GO division on January 11, 2021.

Gears of War
The Team Envy Gears of War (GoW) division was founded on January 4, 2012, when the organization formed the professional GoW team "EnVyUs MbN". The team competed in Gears of War 3, where they placed 4th in the LAN tournament Hypefestation 2.

In October 2015, Envy announced they were re-entering the GoW competitive scene for Gears of War: Ultimate Edition and were revealed as one of eight teams in ESL's GoW Pro League. In Season 1 of the league, Envy finished runners-up to Denial Esports. In Season 2, they became champions after defeating Denial in a rematch of the finals following a 12–2 regular season record; the tournament win marked their first ever Gears of War title. In July 2016, without dropping a single map, Envy won their second title at the Gears eSports European Open in London.

Heading into Gears of War 4, Envy competed in the Coalition's $1 million Gears Pro Circuit. Their campaign included multiple second-place finishes, as well as the team's third championship in January 2017, when the team dethroned OpTic Gaming at the Mexico City Open, the first ever GoW event in Latin America.

On June 13, 2017, shortly after the end of the Gears Pro Circuit, Team Envy announced they had departed from the Gears of War esports scene following the transfer of their roster to Echo Fox.

Halo
The Team Envy Halo division was founded on November 10, 2015, when the organization signed a professional esports team for Halo 5: Guardians; the roster included Justin "Pistola" Deese and Austin "Mickwen" McCleary. The team failed to qualify for the 2016 Halo World Championship after being knocked out of the group stages at the NA Regional Finals.

Their first major breakthrough came in July 2016, when the team finished 3rd place at the NA HCS Pro League - 2016 Summer Finals. In the offseason to follow, Envy acquired rookie Cuyler "Huke" Garland and veteran Eric "Snip3down" Wrona. In November, they obtained their first Halo championship after winning HCS Las Vegas 2016. Shortly afterwards, in December, the team dethroned OpTic Gaming and won their second championship at the NA HCS Pro League - 2016 Fall Finals. Their 2016–17 season campaign ended with a runners-up finish at the 2017 Halo World Championship, where the team produced a 5–0 loser's bracket run before losing to OpTic Gaming in the grand finals.

In May 2017, Envy won their third Halo championship at HCS Daytona 2017. Their 2017–18 season campaign ended in April 2018, following a 3rd-place finish at the 2018 Halo World Championship. On May 24, 2018, Team Envy announced they had departed from the Halo esports scene following the release of their roster.

Team Envy announced their return to the Halo esports scene on October 12, 2020, announcing four new players to compete under head coach Alex "Swift Kill" Ramirez for the upcoming Halo franchise game Halo Infinite. After the merger of Envy Gaming and OpTic Gaming in 2021, OpTic took over Team Envy's Halo division.

League of Legends
On May 18, 2016, after passing Riot's vetting process, Team Envy officially purchased Renegades’ NA LCS spot in a deal reportedly valued in excess of $1 million.

In their inaugural split, following a perfect 4–0 start, Envy finished in 6th place achieving a playoffs berth, where they were eliminated in the first round. In the last chance Regional Qualifier for the 2016 League of Legends World Championship, the team once again fell short after losing in the second round to eventual winners Cloud9.

Following the 2017 Spring Split, Envy faced relegation and had to compete in the Summer Promotion Tournament. In the Promotion Tournament, they qualified into the 2017 NA LCS Summer Split after defeating Gold Coin United 3–2 in the loser's bracket finals.

On November 20, 2017, Team Envy withdrew from League of Legends after their franchise application for the 2018 NA LCS season was declined.

Overwatch

Formed during the Overwatch closed beta in February 2016, Team EnVyUs acquired the players of Team Hubris, a North American squad that finished first in six of the seven tournaments played during the beta, to officially create their Overwatch esports division. The team won Season 1 of OGN's Overwatch APEX in Seoul, Korea, marking the first time that a Western-owned team had taken home an esports title on Korean soil. Returning home from Korea, Team EnVyUs ended their pre-Overwatch League journey on a high, going undefeated and winning Season 1 of North America's Overwatch Contenders. On September 20, 2017, Blizzard officially announced that Envy Gaming had acquired the Dallas-based Overwatch League franchise spot, making them one of twelve teams competing in the inaugural season. The team was branded as the Dallas Fuel, and all of the existing members of Team EnVyUs were transferred to the Fuel roster – ending Team Envy's Overwatch division.

On July 2, 2018, Envy Gaming formally announced Team Envy's return to Overwatch Contenders as an academy team for the Dallas Fuel, as the team acquired EnVision Esports' Contenders slot and roster and signed former Team EnVyUs member Ronnie "Talespin" DuPree. The team defeated ATL Academy in the 2019 Season 1 Finals by a combined map record of 7–1 to claim their second Overwatch Contenders regional title. In 2019 Season 2 of Contenders, Envy defeated New York Excelsior's academy team XL2 Academy in the finals to secure their third Contenders regional title.

On April 27, 2020, Team Envy disbanded their Overwatch Contenders division.

Rocket League
The Team Envy Rocket League division was founded on June 21, 2017, when the organization acquired Northern Gaming's active roster; the roster included Season 3 Rocket League Championship Series champions Remco "Remkoe" den Boer and David "Deevo" Morrow. The organisation separated with the roster on July 30, 2018.

Team Envy reentered Rocket League on April 25, 2020, picking up the ex-Ghost roster consisting of players Braxton "Allushin" Lagarec, Massimo "Atomic" Franceschi, Nick "mist" Costello, and coach Spencer "furane" Taub. Two months later, on June 25, 2020, four-time World Champion Pierre "Turbopolsa" Silfver was added to the starting roster, moving Allushin to the inactive roster. On August 6, 2020, Allushin was confirmed to have left Envy, having joined The Peeps ahead of RLCS Season X.

SMITE
The Team Envy SMITE division was founded on October 5, 2015, when the organization acquired the North American team AFK Gaming. The team's only championship came in January 2016, when they won the 2016 SMITE World Championship - Xbox One Invitational. In May 2016, during a match against SoaR, Envy violated the SMITE Pro League code of conduct after they forfeited their second game less than two minutes in; the pro-level rage-quit is branded "the worst match in SPL history" and resulted in Hi-Rez sanctioning each participating Envy player with a $500 fine.

On November 30, 2016, Team Envy announced they had departed from the SMITE esports scene following the release of their roster.

Valorant
On July 13, 2020, Team Envy signed as an official organization for Valorant esports. They signed on Adam "aKis" Kisseberth, Abdo "C4Lypso" Agha, Pujan "FNS" Mehta, Anthony "mummAy" DiPaolo, and Jake "kaboose" McDonald as their first 5. After participating in a few events, Team Envy took the next step in building out their Valorant roster. On September 12, they added Victor "Victor" Wong and Austin "Crashies" Roberts and added "aKis" and "C4Lypso" to their reserve team. On June 30, 2021, they loaned Jimmy "Marved" Nguyen from FaZe Clan and moved Jake "kaboose" McDonald to the bench. On August 5, 2021, they acquired Jaccob "yay" Whiteaker from Andbox and moved Anthony "mummAy" DiPaolo to the bench. When asked the difference between Andbox and Team Envy, yay commented that Envy's players were "more instinctual" and that they "understand how to support my playstyle better so that I am best set up for success". On February 10, 2022, the team announced that it would be competing under the OpTic Gaming brand moving forward.

Ownership and finances
In March 2017, it was revealed that prior to becoming chief business officer of Team Envy, John Brock had invested a seven-figure sum into the team. In August 2017, John Brock confirmed that the reported multimillion-dollar investment from venture capital firm SierraMaya360, in late 2016, never materialized.

On September 18, 2017, Team Envy owner Mike "Hastr0" Rufail confirmed that the organization had secured a multimillion-dollar investment from Hersh Interactive Group. The deal entailed Hersh serving as strategic partners to the organization, whilst Hastr0 would remain as the principal owner and operator of the team.

In November 2017, Team Envy signed a multimillion-dollar, multiyear deal with the restaurant chain Jack in the Box.

In August 2020, Post Malone acquired a majority stake, joining as a co-owner.

Notable alumni

Awards and nominations

References

External links

 

 

 
2007 establishments in the United States
Esports teams based in the United States
Defunct and inactive Call of Duty teams
Defunct and inactive Counter-Strike teams
Defunct and inactive FIFA (video game series) teams
Defunct and inactive Gears of War teams
Defunct and inactive Halo (franchise) teams
Former North American League of Legends Championship Series teams
Defunct and inactive Smite (video game) teams
Defunct and inactive StarCraft teams
Esports teams established in 2007
Counter-Strike teams
PlayerUnknown's Battlegrounds teams
2022 disestablishments in the United States
Esports teams disestablished in 2022